Joyce A. Maker is an American politician from Maine. A Republican, Maker has served in local government, including the Calais Town Council and School Board as well as in the Maine House of Representatives (District 31) from 2010 until 2016. A retired college administrator, Maker worked for Washington County Community College. She attended both the University of Maine at Machias and Washington County Community College. She also served on the board and as chair of the Finance Authority of Maine.

In June 2016, Maker won the primary for her party's nomination in Senate District 6, which includes all of Washington County and some of Hancock County. She defeated Calais City Councilor Billy Howard, who was endorsed by Governor Paul LePage. Maker defeated Democrat Rock Alley in the November general election, and took office in December.

References

Year of birth missing (living people)
Living people
People from Calais, Maine
Republican Party members of the Maine House of Representatives
Washington County Community College alumni
University of Maine at Machias alumni
Women state legislators in Maine
Maine city council members
School board members in Maine
Women city councillors in Maine
21st-century American politicians
21st-century American women politicians